Joyce is an unincorporated community in Clallam County, Washington, United States.

Founded around 1913 by Joseph M. Joyce, Joyce is located on scenic State Highway 112, 16 miles west of Port Angeles and 33 miles east of Clallam Bay.  The town of Joyce has a historic general store originally opened in 1911, museum, cafe, and other business establishments.  Joyce has an annual celebration called Joyce Daze usually held around the beginning of August.  Joyce is also home to the Crescent School District.

Climate
This region experiences warm (but not hot) and dry summers, with no average monthly temperatures above 71.6 °F.  According to the Köppen Climate Classification system, Joyce has a warm-summer Mediterranean climate, abbreviated "Csb" on climate maps.

Earthquake preparations
Residents of Joyce are very much aware of the real possibility of a catastrophic earthquake in the Cascadia subduction zone where the town is located. As there is  only one road into the town, which may be disrupted by an earthquake, Joyce residents have set up Joyce Emergency Planning and Preparation (JEPP) to provide food and shelter for the approximately thirty days it is estimated that might be required to restore supply routes. This was spurred after seeing the devastation that lack of pre-planning allowed to happen, even in an advanced country, in the aftermath of Hurricane Katrina.

See also 
 East Twin Falls, located about 15 mi. west

References

External links 
 Joyce, Washington Community Web

Unincorporated communities in Clallam County, Washington
Unincorporated communities in Washington (state)